Carlos Góngora Mercado (born April 25, 1989) is an Ecuadorian professional boxer who  held the IBO super middleweight title between  2020 and December 2021. As an amateur, he won a bronze medal at the 2007 Pan American Games in Rio in the men's middleweight division.

Amateur career

Middleweight 
At the 2006 South American Games southpaw Góngora lost the final to Venezuelan Alfonso Blanco. At the 2007 Pan American Games the then 18-year-old from El Coca easily beat Blanco 20:6 in a rematch before losing to eventual winner Emilio Correa from Cuba in the semis 13:21.

At the 2007 World Championships he beat Ivano del Monte but ran into superstar and eventual winner Matvey Korobov and lost when the referee stopped the contest.

At the Copa Independencia 2008 he reached the final but lost to old foe Correa 3:16. At the Olympic qualifier he lost once again to Correa but qualified nevertheless after beating fighters like Shawn Estrada.

At the 2008 Olympics he won his first matches against German Konstantin Buga and Greek Georgios Gazis 12:1 but a surprise quarter final loss to Indian Vijender Singh kept him from winning a medal.

Light Heavyweight
Góngora moved up to light heavyweight after the 2008 Olympics. He didn't win a medal at the 2009 World Amateur Boxing Championships. He won his first match against Gianluca Rosciglione 15:1, and his second against Abdelhafid Benchebla 13:10 but lost in the quarter-final to José Larduet 10:6.

In 2010 he beat Yamil Peralta and Roaner Angulo to win the South American Games.

He won another bronze at the 2011 Pan American Games, losing to Julio César la Cruz. He again did not win a medal at the 2011 World Amateur Boxing Championships. He beat Osman Bravo (contest stopped due to injury) but lost his next match against Yamaguchi Falcão (25:18).

He lost to Marcus Browne at the American Olympic Qualifying Tournament but managed to qualify for the Olympics 2012.

At the 2012 Olympics, Góngora won his first match against Azerbaijani Vatan Huseynli. Góngora then lost his next match, in the round of 16, against Kazakh Adilbek Niyazymbetov. Niyazymbetov would go on to the finals.

Professional boxing record

References

External links
PanAm 2007 results
World 2007

1989 births
Living people
Sportspeople from Esmeraldas, Ecuador
Middleweight boxers
Boxers at the 2008 Summer Olympics
Boxers at the 2012 Summer Olympics
Boxers at the 2011 Pan American Games
Olympic boxers of Ecuador
Ecuadorian male boxers
Pan American Games bronze medalists for Ecuador
Pan American Games medalists in boxing
South American Games gold medalists for Ecuador
South American Games silver medalists for Ecuador
South American Games medalists in boxing
Competitors at the 2006 South American Games
Competitors at the 2010 South American Games
Medalists at the 2011 Pan American Games
21st-century Ecuadorian people